is a former Japanese football player. He played for Japan national team.

Club career
Kuwata was born in Hiroshima on June 26, 1941. After graduating from Waseda University, he joined his local club Toyo Industries in 1965. The club won Japan Soccer League champions for 4 years in a row (1965-1968). The club also won 1965, 1967 and 1969 Emperor's Cup. He retired in 1969. He played 62 games and scored 34 goals in the league. He was selected Best Eleven in 1966 and 1967.

National team career
On May 28, 1961, when Kuwata was a Waseda University student, he debuted and scored a goal for Japan national team against Malaya. In 1962, he also played and scored a goal at 1962 Asian Games. He played 5 games and scored 2 goals for Japan until 1962.

Club statistics

National team statistics

Awards
 Japan Soccer League Best Eleven: 1966, 1967
 Japan Soccer League Silver Ball (Assist Leader): 1966

References

External links
 
 Japan National Football Team Database

1941 births
Living people
Waseda University alumni
Association football people from Hiroshima Prefecture
Japanese footballers
Japan international footballers
Japan Soccer League players
Sanfrecce Hiroshima players
Footballers at the 1962 Asian Games
Association football forwards
Asian Games competitors for Japan